Connellia caricifolia is a plant species in the genus Connellia. This species is endemic to Venezuela.

References

caricifolia
Flora of Venezuela
Plants described in 1951